Maravanthe is a village and a beach in Byndoor Taluk, Udupi District, Karnataka, India.

It is about 115 km from industrial hub Mangalore, 55 km from Udupi.18 km from Kundapura. and 21 km from Byndoor. NH-66 (erstwhile NH-17) runs next to the beach and the Suparnika River flows on the other side of the road. Outlook traveller considers it one of Karnataka's most beautiful beaches.

The Suparnika River, which almost touches the Arabian Sea here, makes a U-turn and goes westward to join the sea after a journey of nearly more than 10 km (6.2 mi).

Economy
Fishing is main activity of the fisher folk of this area, but infrastructure for marketing the marine produce is not well developed. Native boats and small diesel trawlers are used for fishing. Seafaring is avoided during the monsoons. Agriculture is another important activity, with coconut, paddy being the main crops.

Education
Primary education and high School education is available in the village. Students go to nearby Kundapura taluk centre for higher education.

Tourism

The Maravanthe beach is a beautiful beach town with white sand spread miles and miles along the coast fetches the beach a nickname of Virgin Beach. This place has been identified by government agencies as having potential for tourism with leaflets proclaiming several facilities. There are places to stay on the highway, but the alternative would be at the nearby town, Kundapura.

At the nearby Gangolli port, tourists can join fishermen in their fishing trips.

See also
Gokarna
Om beach
Murdeshwara
Byndoor
Kundapura

References

Villages in Udupi district
Beaches of Karnataka
Geography of Udupi district